The flux method of crystal growth is a method where the components of the desired substance are dissolved in a solvent (flux). The method is particularly suitable for crystals needing to be free from thermal strain. It takes place in a crucible made of highly stable, non-reactive material. For production of oxide crystals, metals such as platinum, tantalum, and niobium are common. Production of metallic crystals generally uses crucibles made from ceramics such as alumina, zirconia, and boron nitride. The crucibles and their contents are often isolated from the air for reaction, either by sealing them in a quartz ampoule or by using a furnace with atmosphere control. A saturated solution is prepared by keeping the constituents of the desired crystal and the flux at a temperature slightly above the saturation temperature long enough to form a complete solution. Then the crucible is cooled in order to allow the desired material to precipitate. Crystal formation can begin by spontaneous nucleation or may be encouraged by the use of a seed. As material precipitates out of the solution, the amount of solute in the flux decreases and the temperature at which the solution is saturated lowers. This process repeats itself as the furnace continues to cool until the solution reaches its melting point or the reaction is stopped artificially. In flux method synthesis, divergent crystal growth kinetics may emerge, with a small number of crystallites growing at the expense of neighbouring ones, resulting in abnormal grain growth.

One advantage of this method is that the crystals grown often display natural facets, which often makes preparing crystals for measurement significantly easier.  A disadvantage is that most flux method syntheses produce relatively small crystals. However, some materials such as the "115" heavy fermion superconductors may grow up to a few centimeters.

See also
 Chemical vapor deposition
 Crystal growth
 Crystallography
 Czochralski process
 Epitaxy
 Hydrothermal synthesis
 Micro-pulling-down
 Verneuil process

External links 
Flux Method for Preparing Crystals
Growth of single crystals from metallic fluxes
Flux Technique

References 

Crystallography
Methods of crystal growth

fr:Cristallogénèse
pt:Cristalografia
sk:Kryštalizácia